Orthetrum africanum is a freshwater dragonfly species, which occurs commonly through central and western Africa. Though deforestation is a threat to the species, there are no predictions of its population declining - mainly because of its widespread range. It breeds in forest streams and rivers.

See also 
Orthetrum

References 

Insects of Africa
Libellulidae
Insects described in 1887